Valerii Vinokur (also spelled as Vinokour, or Valery Vinokour, born 26 April 1949) is a condensed matter physicist who works on superconductivity, the physics of vortices, disordered media and glasses, nonequilibrium physics of dissipative systems, quantum phase transitions, quantum thermodynamics, and topological quantum matter. He is a senior scientist and Argonne Distinguished Fellow at Argonne National Laboratory and a senior scientist at the Consortium for Advanced Science and Engineering, Office of Research and National Laboratories, The University of Chicago. He is a Foreign Member of the National Norwegian Academy of Science and Letters and a Fellow of the American Physical Society.

Career

Vinokur earned his BSc in physics of metals at Moscow Institute of Steel and Alloys in 1972 and moved to the Institute of Solid State Physics, Chernogolovka, Russia, where he received a Ph.D. in physics in 1979. He has held appointments as visiting scientist at CNRS, Grenoble (1987), visiting scientist at Leiden University (1989), visiting scientist at ETH (Zurich) (1990), and as visiting director of research at Ecole Normale Superieure (Paris) (1996). Since 1990 Vinokur has worked at the Argonne National Laboratory, having become Distinguished Argonne Fellow in 2009. Since 2018, he has been a senior scientist at the Consortium for Advanced Science and Engineering, Office of Research and National Laboratories, The University of Chicago.

Honors, awards and fellowships 

 Fellow of the American Physical Society, 1998
 University of Chicago Distinguished Performance Award, 1998
 International John Bardeen Prize, 2003
 Alexander von Humboldt Research Award, 2003
 Foreign Member of the Norwegian National Academy of Letters and Science, 2013
 Alexander von Humboldt Research Award, 2013
 International Abrikosov Prize, 2017
 Fritz London Memorial Prize, 2020

References 

1949 births
Fellows of the American Physical Society
Argonne National Laboratory people
American physicists
Living people
Russian physicists
Jewish physicists
Theoretical physicists